Wangkatha, otherwise written Wongatha, Wongutha, Wankatja, Wongi or Wangai, is a language and the identity of eight Aboriginal Australian peoples of the Eastern Goldfields region. The Wangkatja language groups cover the following towns: Coolgardie, Kalgoorlie, Menzies, Leonora and Laverton; these towns encompass the North-eastern Goldfields region of Western Australia.

Name
The term / derives from a verbal root meaning 'to speak'.

The more formal and correct term is either Wangkatha or Wongatha. Other spellings include Wongutha and Wangkatja.

History

The Wongi, being very active in their traditional country, were the first to show European and British explorers their country, notably water and precious minerals in their country. The Wongi showed Irish explorer and discoverer Paddy Hannan his first gold nugget. Being a valuable stone, the Wongi worshipped it due to their traditional Tjukurrpa (Dreaming lore) under their traditional practices and governance systems. Still today, the Tjukurrpa is respected and highly revered. They sporadically fought White settlers who came to the area for gold in the 1890s.

During the early 1900s the Wongutha/Wangkatha were considered the "most fierce, wild and untamable" of all Aboriginal people in Western Australia. The Australian Government did not know what to do with these people. 

Therefore, white missionaries from New South Wales disembarked to Western Australia to establish an area that is now known as the Mount Margaret Aboriginal Community. Many of the Aboriginal people who are of the Wongutha/Wangkatha language were part of Mount Margaret. All Aboriginal people who were placed in Mount Margaret were educated by the western system and learnt about Christianity. There came other neighbouring language/tribal groups who spoke similar languages and shared Tjukurrpa, such as the Pitjantjatjara and the Ngaanyatjarra. Other foreign language groups with different languages and customs also were placed at Mount Margaret Mission, which included Ngadju, Tjupan and Mirning.

Country
The Wongi or Wongatha/Wangkatha language peoples originate from the following areas; Coolgardie, Kalgoorlie, Leonora, Menzies and Laverton. The Wongi group consists of eight peoples: Maduwongga, Waljen, Ngurlutjarra, Ngaanyatjarra, Bindinni, Madatjarra(?), Koara (Kuwarra) and Tjalkatjarra. The Wongi Wongatha-Wonganarra Aboriginal Corporation was put into liquidation in 2010. Today, their native title land rights interests are represented by the Goldfields Aboriginal Land and Sea Council Corporation.

Language

Wangkatha is still spoken and has roughly 200–300 fluent speakers. Most speakers reside in their traditional country including Coolgardie, Kalgoorlie, Menzies, Leonora, Laverton, Cosmo Newberry and Mulga Queen. The eight tribes who speak Wongi as a collective, have also their own distinct dialects which are also their tribes.

Notable people

 Mrs. Sadie Canning MBE OAM. Mrs. Canning was the first Aboriginal Nurse and Matron in Australia. Mrs. Canning was the head matron at Leonora Hospital in the 1950s. The book called Our Black Nurses: in their own right recognizes Mrs. Canning as the First Aboriginal Nurse and Matron in Australia.
 Mrs. May O'Brien BEM. Mrs. O'Brien was the first Aboriginal female teacher in the state of WA.
 Mr. Ben Mason OBE. Mr. Mason was an Aboriginal evangelist and the only Aboriginal evangelist to have travelled with the late Billy Graham Ministries.
 Mr. James Brennan OAM. Mr. Brennan was a local WW2 veteran and survivor.
 Miss Gloria Brennan. Miss Brennan was the first Aboriginal person to graduate from the University of Western Australia (UWA), having completed her honors in a Bachelor of Arts with a double major in anthropology and linguistics. The Gloria Brennan scholarship is still vacant each year to aspiring Aboriginal university students at UWA.
 Miss Geraldine Hogarth AM. Miss Hogarth was awarded the Member of the Order for Australia Medal due to her commitment to preserving the Koara dialect.
 Miss Annette Stokes AM. Miss Stokes was awarded the Member of the Order for Australia Medal for her contribution to Aboriginal health research.
 Mr. Daniel Wells. AFL footballer Daniel Wells was drafted to North Melbourne Football Club.
 Delson Stokes of Yabu Band. Yabu Band is an Indigenous Australian rock, roots band formed in the mid-1990s in Kalgoorlie. The word  is Wongutha – a western desert tribal language – for 'rock' or 'gold'.
Boyd Stokes of Yabu Band. Yabu Band is an Indigenous Australian rock, roots band formed in the mid-1990s in Kalgoorlie. The word  is Wongutha – a western desert tribal language – for 'rock' or 'gold'.
 Mr. Syd Jackson - WAFL/VFL Champion player for East Perth and Carlton. Member of the Indigenous Team of the Century and East Perth team of the Century, Syd was taken from his family as a child and raised in Roelands Mission near Bunbury.

See also
 Indigenous Australians
 Aboriginal history of Western Australia
 Australian outback literature of the 20th century

Notes

Citations

Sources

Aboriginal peoples of Western Australia
Indigenous Australians from Western Australia
Nullarbor Plain
Goldfields-Esperance